Shion Takeuchi (born September 5, 1988) is an American animator, screenwriter, storyboard artist, producer and showrunner. She is the creator of the Netflix television series Inside Job and has written and produced for shows such as Regular Show, Gravity Falls, Disenchantment and others. She was nominated twice for an Annie Award in "Writing in an Animated Television/Broadcast Production", in 2016 and 2017, for her work on Gravity Falls.

Early life and education
Takeuchi was born on September 5, 1988, and raised in the suburbs of Boston, Massachusetts, where her parents were a technology company executive and former translator. She attended the California Institute of the Arts (CalArts), graduating in 2010 with a BFA in animation. Her thesis film was titled When the Time is Ripe, a coming-of-age story about a Jewish pear.

Career
Takeuchi worked as an intern on the animated series Adventure Time during the first season of its development before joining animator J. G. Quintel to work as a writer and storyboard artist on his Cartoon Network series Regular Show. She was then hired to work in the story department at Pixar where she was involved in the production of the films Monsters University (2013) and Inside Out (2015). She later left Pixar to work as a writer on the Disney animated series Gravity Falls where she stayed until the show's conclusion in 2016. Takeuchi also worked as a writer on the Netflix animated series Disenchantment and the Amazon Prime Video animated series Lost in Oz. Streaming platform Netflix signed a multi-year, multi-project deal with Takeuchi in 2018.

Inside Job

In 2019, Netflix announced the production of the adult animated series Inside Job, created and produced by Takeuchi. The show premiered on October 22, 2021 and went on to become the fifth most streamed show on Netflix in the US and eighth most streamed on the platform globally within a week of its release.

Filmography

Film

Television

Nominations and awards

See also
 Inside Job
 Alex Hirsch
 Gravity Falls

References

External links

1988 births
American cartoonists
American storyboard artists
American television writers
California Institute of the Arts alumni
American people of Japanese descent
Living people
Showrunners
Writers from Boston
Artists from Boston